Prionoglarididae is a family of the order Psocodea (formerly Psocoptera) that are barklice characterized by the reduction or simplification of the lacinia in adults and the specialised form of the male genitalia. It contains the only known genus of animals, Neotrogla, where females possess a penis-like organ and take on typical male sex roles.

Prionoglarididae includes about 9 genera with more than 20 known species.  They have been found in Europe, Afghanistan, Namibia, and the United States.  The only genus found in the United States is Speleketor, which includes three species:  Speleketor flocki, Speleketor irwini, and Speleketor pictus.

Genera
These eight genera belong to the family Prionoglarididae:
 Afrotrogla Lienhard, 2007
 Neotrogla Lienhard, Oliveira do Carmo & Lopes Ferreira, 2010
 Prionoglaris Enderlein, 1909
 Sensitibilla Lienhard, 2000
 Siamoglaris Lienhard, 2004
 Speleketor Gurney, 1943
 Speleopsocus Lienhard, 2010
 † Palaeosiamoglaris Azar, Huang & Nel, 2017 Burmese amber, Myanmar, Cenomanian, and Lebanese amber, Lebanon, Barremian

References 

Psocoptera families
Trogiomorpha